The Devil and Father Amorth is a 2017 American documentary film directed by William Friedkin showing the ninth exorcism of an Italian woman in the village of Alatri referred to as "Cristina", this time performed by Father Gabriele Amorth.

Cast
 Gabriele Amorth
 Robert Barron
 William Friedkin

Production
Mark Kermode, a British film critic and long-time admirer of Friedkin, was invited to assist in writing narration.

Release
The film premiered at the 74th Venice International Film Festival on August 31, 2017. It had a wide release in the United States on April 20, 2018.

Reception
On review aggregator website Rotten Tomatoes, the film holds an approval rating of 44% based on 39 reviews, with an average rating of 4.88/10. The website's critical consensus reads, "The Devil and Father Amorth sets out to interrogate age-old questions of faith, but fails to find enough compelling answers -- or reasons for viewers to watch." On Metacritic, the film has a weighted average score of 46 out of 100, based on 16 critics, indicating "mixed or average reviews".

Robbie Collin of The Telegraph wrote that the film "feels amateurish and arguably also exploitative [...] although perhaps that lends it credibility: in this context, too much polish would almost certainly be cause for suspicion." Owen Gleiberman of Variety called the film "a rather tawdry charade."

References

External links

 

2017 films
2017 documentary films
American documentary films
Demons in film
Films about Catholic priests
Films directed by William Friedkin
Films shot in Molise
Films about exorcism
LD Entertainment films
The Orchard (company) films
Religious horror films
2010s English-language films
2010s American films